Njoki Susanna Ndung'u is a Kenyan lawyer and a justice of the Supreme Court of Kenya. She holds a Bachelor of Laws (LLB) from University of Nairobi and a Master of Laws (LLM) in human rights and civil liberties from the University of Leicester in the United Kingdom. She was born in 1966.

Early career
Njoki, an alumna of the Kenya High School, began her career between 1989 and 1993 at the Office of the Attorney General as a state counsel. She later worked as a programme officer (Civic Education) with the Institute For Education in Democracy until 1995, when she moved and worked for one year at UNHCR Kenya Branch Office as a national protection officer. Between 2000 and 2002 she worked as a political analyst for the Organization of African Unity, (OAU).

National Assembly
She served as a National Rainbow Coalition (NARC)-nominated member of Parliament between 2003 and 2007 and served on the following Parliamentary committees:
 Departmental Committee on Administration of Justice and Legal Affairs
 Departmental Committee on Defense and Foreign Affairs
 Select Committee on the Constitution of Kenya
 Committee on Conflict and International Cooperation (PAP)

She also moved several private members bills, including:
 Motion on Maternity Benefits
 Amendments on Maternity and Paternity Rights in Employment Act 2007
 Key human rights amendments to the Refugee Bill
 ‘Sexual Offences Bill, 2006’

Sexual Offences Act 2006

She was the architect and mover of the ‘Sexual Offenses Bill, 2006’ which was eventually passed as the Sexual Offences Act 2006.

Supreme Court Judge interviews
In June 2012, she was among 5 justices nominated  to the Supreme Court of Kenya by the Judicial Service Commission (Kenya) which had interviewed 25 applicants.

Supreme Court career 

When the first round of the presidential election took place on March 4, 2013. Uhuru Kenyatta was declared the president-elect of Kenya by the Independent Electoral and Boundaries Commission. Raila Odinga challenged this in the Supreme Court of Kenya. She was one of the six judges who dismissed the petition on March 30, 2013.
At the conclusion of the 2017 presidential election petition, Lady Justice Njoki Ndung'u rendered a dissenting opinion alongside Justice Jacktone Boma Ojwang, citing  no evidence to announce the elections as null and void.

See also
 Supreme Court of Kenya
 Africa is a Woman's Name - a documentary about three women, including Ndung'u

References

Living people
20th-century Kenyan lawyers
21st-century Kenyan judges
1965 births
Kenyan women judges
University of Nairobi alumni
Alumni of the University of Leicester
Alumni of Kenya High School
21st-century women judges